Colin Gander (born January 12, 2000) is a Canadian soccer player who plays as a defender for Guelph United FC in League1 Ontario.

Early life 
In his youth, Gander played youth soccer with Kitchener SC, later joining the Toronto FC Academy.

College/University career
In 2019, Gander began attending Missouri State University, where he joined the men's soccer team, although he redshirted the 2019-20 Missouri Valley Conference season.

In 2020, Gander transferred to the University of Guelph joining the men's soccer team, although his inaugural season was delayed until the 2021-22 school year, due to the season being cancelled by the COVID-19 pandemic. He scored his first goal on October 22, against the Brock Badgers. In the 2021–22 season, he won the OUA title.

Club career
In 2017 and 2018, he played with Toronto FC III in League1 Ontario.

In 2020, he trained with Toronto Skillz FC.

In 2021, he played with Guelph United F.C.

At the 2022 CPL-U Sports Draft, Gander was selected in the second round (eleventh overall) by the HFX Wanderers. In April 2022, he signed a developmental contract with the Wanderers, which allows him to maintain his university eligibility. He made his debut on April 16, coming on as a substitute against Atlético Ottawa. In mid-August, as part of his developmental contract, he departed the team to return to play for his university.

In 2023, he returned to Guelph United FC.

References

External links

2000 births
Living people
Soccer people from Ontario
Sportspeople from Kitchener, Ontario
Association football defenders
Canadian Premier League players
League1 Ontario players
Canadian soccer players
Toronto FC players
Toronto Skillz FC players
HFX Wanderers FC players
HFX Wanderers FC draft picks
Guelph United F.C. players
Guelph Gryphons men's soccer players